Mithu Sen is an Indian conceptual artist. Born in West Bengal in 1971.

Early life and education
Sen was born in 1971 in West Bengal and obtained Bachelor's and Master's degrees in painting from Kala Bhavan at Visva-Bharati University in Santiniketan, West Bengal. Later, she completed a post-graduate program (visiting) at the Glasgow School of Art in the United Kingdom on the Charles Wallace India Trust Award for 2000–2001.

Sen's Bengali poetry has been published in collected volumes, as well as in magazines and journals since she was a young adult.

Work
Sen’s conceptual practice with a varied set of surfaces, materials, and processes that emerge in the wake of her regular negotiations with her milieu. Her work often deals with the complexities of the body in its physical, basal, erotic and sexless forms. A lot of her works deal with the self as a matrix of identities and myths – questioning societal norms, fixed beliefs, and categorisations.

Sen's material art work, which she calls “byproducts” of her larger process, contrast scale, imagery and genre to problematize existing notions of hospitality, sexuality, communication, and contract. Known for her often erotically and emotionally charged imagery, Sen’s work blurs the line between distance and intimacy, often explored through what she calls “radical hospitality”.

Using the virtual and the real forms of social relation and individual experience, both spontaneous and premeditated, Sen creates work fundamentally as a performer. Many of her performance-based works challenge the notion of language as a proprietary means of communication, attempting to outsmart linguistic hegemonies and codes of propriety by creating an abstract body of gibberish text she calls “non-language”. Non-language, whose use creates moments of what Sen calls “lingual anarchy” employs glitch, noise, sonic affect in its spontaneous creation. Before turning to the aporias of non-communicative language, Sen was a practicing poet in Bengali.

Sen’s recent works extend from the promise of language and community to the legality of contract, opening up questions caught between law and living.

Career and exhibitions
Sen was the first artist to be awarded The Skoda Prize in 2010 for Indian contemporary art. In 2015, she also won the Prudential Eye Award for the Best Emerging Artist Using Drawing.

Her selected exhibitions and projects include:

Solo exhibitions
 'UnMYthU | Byproducts of twenty years of performance', Chemould, Mumbai, 2018
 Mit i sny (Myth and Dreams), City Gallery Arsenal, Poznan, Poland 2018.
 A ° V o i d, Galerie Krinzinger, Vienna, 2014
 Border Unseen, Eli and Edythe Broad Art Museum, Michigan USA, 2014
 Devoid, Gallery Nathalie Obadia, Paris  2012
 In House Adoption, Gallery Steph and Nature morte, Singapore 2012
 In Transit, Espace Louis Vuitton, Taipei, Taiwan, 2011
 Black Candy (iforgotmypenisathome) Chemould, Mumbai, 2010; SAA, JNU, New Delhi 2010; Max Mueller Bhavan, New Delhi, 2011
 Nothing lost in Translation, Nature Morte, Berlin 2010
 I Dig, I Look Down at Albion Gallery, London, in 2008
 Half Full – Part I at Bose Pacia, New York, in 2007
 It's Good to be Queen at Bose Pacia Artist Space, New York, in 2006
 I Hate Pink, Lakeeren Art Gallery, Mumbai, 2003
 Unbelongings, Machintosh Gallery, Glasgow, Scotland, 2001

Solo Performances / Projects
 (Un)mansplaining, Venice, 2019
 Lunch is Cancelled, Shalini Passi Art Foundation, India Art Fair, New Delhi, 2019
 100 (Un)Silent Ways, Speaker's Forum, India Art Fair, New Delhi, 2019
 UNhome in City IF Angels, 18th Streets Art Center Los Angeles, USA, 2017
 Mis(s)Guide, PEM (Peebody Essex Museum) Salem, USA, 2016
 Aphasia, Solomon R. Guggenheim Museum & Asia Society Museum, New York, 2016
 Tongue that won't stop wounding, After Midnight, Queens Museum, New York City
 I have only one language; it is not mine, Kochi-Muziris Biennale, Kochi, 2014.
 Shop Lifting, Art Chennai, Chennai, 2014.
 I am a Poet, Word. Sound. Power, Performance at Khoj Studio, Delhi, 2014.

Selected group exhibitions
 Documenta 26, Kassel, Germany
 APT9-9@th Asia Pacific Triennale of Contemporary art, Queensland Art Gallery, Gallery of Modern Art,  Australia 2018
 Contemporary Photographic and New Media Art, FotoFest International 2018 Biennial, U.S. 2018
 Facing India, : Kunstmuseum Wolfsburg, Germany 2018
 Delirium // Equilibrium, Kiran Nadar Museum of Art, New Delhi 2018
 I replace you, Kathmandu Triennale, Kathmandu, Nepal 2017
 Drawing Now, Albertina Museum, Vienna 2015
 Drawing the Bottom Line, S.M.A.K museum, Gent, Belgium 2015
 Canson Grand Prix award show, Palais De Tokyo, Paris 2015
 After Midnight | Queens Museum, New York 2015
 Kochi-Muziris Biennale, Kochi 2014
 Poems declined, Dhaka Art Summit 2014, Dhaka, Bangladesh 2014
 The Body in Indian Art, Centre for Fine Arts, Bozar Museum, Brussels.2013
 Word. Sound. Power. I am a Poet, Performance at Tate Modern Project Space, London .2013
 I chew I bite, The Unknown, Mediations Biennale, Poznań, Poland 2011
 Spheres 4, Gallery Continua, Le Moulin 2011
 Generation in transition, New art from India, Zachęta National Gallery of Art, Warsaw and CAC in Vilnius, Lithuania 2011
 Abstract Cabinet, Eastside project space, Birmingham. 2009
 Emotional Drawing, SOMA, Seoul, South Korea 2009
 Emotional Drawing, Museum of Modern Art, Tokyo 2008
 Comme des bêtes, Lausanne Museum, Berne, Switzerland 2008
 Horn Please, Kunst Museum, Berne, Switzerland 2007
 "Private / Corporate 4," Daimler Chrysler Collection, Berlin 2007

Personal life
Sen lives and works in New Delhi. She is an enthusiastic traveller.

References

Indian women painters
Living people
1971 births
Painters from West Bengal
21st-century Indian women artists